Yalarnnga (also Jalarnnga, Jalanga, Yelina, Yellunga, Yellanga, Yalarrnnga, Yalanga or Yalluna) is an extinct Australian Aboriginal language of the Pama–Nyungan language family, that may be related to the Kalkatungu language. It was formerly spoken by the Yalarnnga people in areas near the Gulf of Carpentaria the towns of Dajarra and Cloncurry in far northwestern Queensland. The last native speaker died in 1980. It is a suffixing agglutinative language with no attested prefixes.

Classification 
Yalarnnga is sometimes grouped with Kalkatungu as the Kalkatungic (Galgadungic) branch of the Pama–Nyungan family. O'Grady et al., however, classify Kalkatungu as the sole member of the "Kalkatungic group" of the Pama-Nyungan family, and Dixon (2002) regards Kalkatungic as an areal group.

Vocabulary 
Some words from the Yalarnnga language, as spelt and written by Yalarnnga authors include:
 Kuyungu mungatha: good day
 Karlu / karlo: father
 Mernoo: mother
 Woothane: whiteman
 Kathirr: grass
 Karni: shoulder
 Katyimpa: two
 Kunyu: water
 Karrkuru: yellowbelly (fish)
 Monero: tame dog

References

Kalkatungic languages
Extinct languages of Queensland
Indigenous Australian languages in Queensland